James Kwak (born 1969) is a Professor of Law at the University of Connecticut School of Law, best known as co-founder, with Simon Johnson, in September 2008, of the economics blog "The Baseline Scenario", a commentary on developments in the global economy, law, and public policy, mostly focused on the situation in the USA.  Kwak received his A.B. magna cum laude in 1990 from Harvard University and his Ph.D. on French intellectual history in 1997 from the University of California, Berkeley (1997). While he frequently writes about the subject, Kwak holds no degrees in economics. He justifies this by stating that economics education below the PhD level is misleading.

Kwak has worked as a consultant for McKinsey & Company and later was Director of Product Marketing at Ariba, where he led product strategy and marketing for the Platform Solutions division and the Ariba Network. He was a co-founder of Guidewire Software, an independent software vendor for the property and casualty insurance industry.

After receiving his JD from Yale in 2011 he joined the faculty of the University of Connecticut School of Law in August 2011.

He wrote the 2017 book Economism: Bad Economics and the Rise of Inequality. He co-wrote, with Simon Johnson, the 2010 book 13 Bankers: The Wall Street Takeover and the Next Financial Meltdown and the 2012 book White House Burning: The Founding Fathers, Our National Debt, and Why It Matters to You. He is also an online columnist for The Atlantic.

References 

1969 births
American computer businesspeople
American people of Chinese descent
American businesspeople
Harvard University alumni
Living people
University of California, Berkeley alumni
University of Connecticut faculty
Yale Law School alumni